Los Triunfadores is the fourth studio album released by Los Bukis in 1979.

Track listing

All songs written and composed by Marco Antonio Solís except for "Las Holgazanas".

References

1979 albums
Los Bukis albums